Francis Adams (12 February 1835 – 10 February 1911) was an Australian cricketer, who played for New South Wales in First class cricket. His nephew, Frank Iredale, played Test cricket for Australia.

Personal life
Adams was born in Ireland in 1835 and arrived in Australia with his family on the "Agnes" in February 1842.
In his business life he worked for the AJS Bank. He was appointed manager in May 1884, a position he held until resigning in August 1907.

References

External links
player profile

1835 births
1911 deaths
Australian cricketers
New South Wales cricketers